Still Thinkin' 'bout You is a country album by Billy "Crash" Craddock. It was released on ABC/Dot Records in 1975. The album yielded two hit singles- "I Love the Blues and the Boogie Woogie", which went to #10, and "Still Thinkin' 'bout You", which went to #1.

Track listing
"Still Thinkin' 'bout You" (Johnny Christopher) - 2:28
"You've Never Been This Far Before" (Conway Twitty) - 2:01
"I Love The Blues And The Boogie Woogie" (Darrell Statler) - 2:53
"No Deposit, No Return" (J. Adrian) - 3:57
"Please James" (R. Bourke) - 2:35
"Don't Go City Girl On Me" (M. Kosser/R. Van Hoy) - 2:23
"Sounds Of Love" (N. Davenport) - 2:54
"Foxy Lady" (R. Chancey/J. Carvet) - 2:34
"Piece Of The Rock" (J. Peters) - 3:07
"Stay A Little Longer In Your Bed" (J. Adrian) - 2:57

NB: Tracks 1 & 2 timed at 3:01 and 3:00 respectively (Actual times on LP)

Personnel
Steel Guitar: Lloyd Green
Lead Guitar: Billy Sanford
Rhythm Guitars: Jerry Shook, James Colvard, Chip Young & Jimmy Capps
Electric Bass Guitars: Tommy Allsup & Harold Bradley
Piano: Bobby Wood & Ron Oats
Piano & Clavinet: David Briggs & Bobby Emmons
Bass: Bob Moore, Tommy Cogbill & Henry Strzelecki
Drums: Willie Ackerman & Kenneth Buttrey
Fiddles & Violins: Buddy Spicher & Lisa Silver
Horn Arrangements (tracks 3 & 6): Bergen White

Background Singers
Hurshel Wiginton
Sharon Vaughn
Dolores Edgin
Joe Babcock
Wendellyn Suits

Production
Recorded at: Woodland Sound Studios, Nashville, Tenn.
Producer: Ron Chancey
Recording Engineer & Mixer: Tommy Semmes
Backup Engineers: Pat Higdon & David McKinley
Mastering Engineer: Bob Sowell

Billy "Crash" Craddock albums
1975 albums
Albums produced by Ron Chancey